Ageratina occidentalis is a species of flowering plant in the family Asteraceae known by the common name western snakeroot or western eupatorium. It is native to the western United States where it grows in several types of habitat. It is found in California, Oregon, Washington, Idaho, Montana, Nevada, and Utah.

Ageratina occidentalis is a rhizomatous perennial herb growing fuzzy green or purple stems to a maximum height near 70 centimeters. Its leaves are glandular and triangular, with serrated edges. The inflorescence is a dense cluster of fuzzy flower heads containing long, protruding disc florets in shades of white, pink, and blue. There are no ray florets. The fruit is an achene a few millimeters long with a rough, bristly pappus.

Etymology
Ageratina is derived from Greek meaning 'un-aging', in reference to the flowers keeping their color for a long time. This name was used by Dioscorides for a number of different plants.

The name Eupatorium comes from the Greek king Mithridates Eupator, who is said to have discovered that a species in the genus could be used as an antidote to a common poison.

In popular culture 
This article was the topic of conversation in the second episode of series one of the web series "Two Of These People Are Lying" hosted by The Technical Difficulties.

References

External links

United States Department of Agriculture Plants Profile

occidentalis
Plants described in 1833
Flora of the Western United States